The maquis canastero, iquico or iquico canastero (Asthenes heterura) is a species of bird in the family Furnariidae.

It is found in the Yungas of Argentina and Bolivia. Its natural habitats are subtropical or tropical moist montane forest and subtropical or tropical high-altitude shrubland. It is threatened by habitat loss.

References

maquis canastero
Birds of the Yungas
maquis canastero
maquis canastero
Taxonomy articles created by Polbot